Iurii Krakovetskii (born 27 August 1992 in Bishkek, Kyrgyzstan) is a Kyrgyzstani judoka. He competed at the 2012 Summer Olympics in the +100 kg event.

References

External links
 
 

1992 births
Living people
Kyrgyzstani male judoka
Olympic judoka of Kyrgyzstan
Judoka at the 2012 Summer Olympics
Judoka at the 2016 Summer Olympics
Sportspeople from Bishkek
Kyrgyzstani people of Russian descent
Judoka at the 2010 Asian Games
Judoka at the 2014 Asian Games
Asian Games competitors for Kyrgyzstan
20th-century Kyrgyzstani people
21st-century Kyrgyzstani people